Anaspididae is a family of freshwater crustacean that is endemic to Tasmania, Australia. The family contains 3 genera and 5 species. This group of crustaceans are considered living fossils. They are commonly and collectively known as the Tasmanian anaspid crustaceans. Anaspidids have stalked eyes, long antennae and antennules, and a slender body with no carapace. The two species of Allanaspides and the single species of Paranaspides are all listed as vulnerable on the IUCN Red List.

Taxonomy
Allanaspides Swain, Wilson, Hickman & Ong, 1970 
Allanaspides hickmani Swain, Wilson & Ong, 1970 – commonly known as Hickman's pygmy mountain shrimp 
Allanaspides helonomus Swain, Wilson, Hickman & Ong, 1970
Anaspides Thomson, 1894 
Anaspides tasmaniae Thomson, 1892 
Anaspides spinulae Williams, 1965
Paranaspides Smith, 1908 
Paranaspides lacustris Smith, 1909

References

Crustaceans of Australia
Syncarida
Crustacean families